

Dinosaurs

Paleontologists
 Birth of Eberhard Fraas.

References

1860s in paleontology
Paleontology
Paleontology 2